Breaktime may refer to:

 Breaktime (organization), a non-profit organization based in Boston, Massachusetts
 Breaktime (novel), a young adult novel by Aidan Chambers

See also